Il Posto is a 1961 Italian film directed by Ermanno Olmi. Often cited as Olmi's first major work, it is an example of Italian neorealism. Olmi won the David di Donatello for Best Director for his work on the film.

Plot
The film tells the story of Domenico, a young man who forgoes the latter part of his education when his family is in need of money.  Applying for a job at a big city corporation, he goes through a bizarre series of exams, physical tests and interviews.  During a brief respite from the tests, he meets Antonietta, a young girl who has similarly forgone her schooling when in need of money to support herself and her mother.  Through the course of this meeting, they have coffee at a local cafe and shyly discuss their ambitions and lives. Domenico is attracted to her, but they are quickly separated when they land jobs in different departments.

Meeting with a superior, he is informed that no clerical positions are available, and subsequently takes a job as a messenger while awaiting a better position. Domenico observes the other employees, at times noting optimistically their kindnesses, and other times the effect of the office gloom on them. Often disappointed in his endeavors to find Antonietta, he sees her one day among two other young men. He does not approach her, but later bumps into her.  She invites him to a New Years Eve party held for the workers, which he decides to attend later in the evening.

Arriving at the party alone, and becoming aware of his awkward loneliness and Antonietta's absence, he accepts the invitation of an older couple to sit with them.  He observes the other youth, dancing and having fun, while he remains silently in the company of the couple. When an older woman asks him to dance, he begins to drink and eventually feel a part of the revels of the party. The night culminates in a simple and free dance in which all the guests participate.

Returning to work the following day, he is offered a recently vacated desk of an employee since departed (an aspiring writer, presumed to have killed himself).  Before being able to settle into the desk, however, the much older staff around him become disquiet, and complain about the number of years that they have waited to sit at the 'prestigious' desk Domenico has found. He learns that he would have to wait 20 years to sit in the first row of the chamber. He is moved to the back in a dimly lit corner, and, as the film ends, Domenico begins his first day in his "job for life".

Cast 
 Loredana Detto as Antonietta Masetti
 Sandro Panseri as Domenico Cantoni
 Tullio Kezich as Psychologist
 Mara Revel as Old Woman
 Guido Spadea as Portioli

Legacy
In July 2018, it was selected to be screened in the Venice Classics section at the 75th Venice International Film Festival.

Awards
 British Film Institute Awards: Sutherland Trophy, Ermanno Olmi; 1961.
 Venice Film Festival: Italian Film Critics Award, Ermanno Olmi; 1961.
 David di Donatello Awards: David, Best Director, Ermanno Olmi; 1962.
 Valladolid International Film Festival: Golden Spike, Ermanno Olmi; 1962.

References

External links 
 
 
Il posto: Handcrafted Cinema an essay by Kent Jones at the Criterion Collection

1961 films
1961 drama films
Italian drama films
Italian black-and-white films
1960s Italian-language films
Social realism in film
Films set in Milan
Titanus films
Films directed by Ermanno Olmi
1960s Italian films